Bajacalifornio a person from one of the former territories or modern states of the Baja California Peninsula of Mexico.  

Similar to Californio, it was a term used from the 19th century to refer to the Californios of the Baja California Territory following the division of California into Alta California Territory and Baja California Territory.

History of Baja California
History of Baja California Sur
People from Baja California
People from Baja California Sur
Mexican California
Californios
Demonyms